Ponsianus Y. Mayona Amtop (born July 28, 1985 in Merauke, Merauke Regency, Papua) is an Indonesian footballer who currently plays for Gresik United in the Indonesia Super League.

References

External links

1985 births
Association football defenders
Association football midfielders
Association football forwards
Living people
People from Merauke Regency
Indonesian footballers
Papuan sportspeople
Liga 1 (Indonesia) players
Gresik United players
PSM Makassar players
Indonesian Premier Division players
Persekabpas Pasuruan players
Persemalra Maluku Tenggara players
Perseman Manokwari players
Persidago Gorontalo players
PSIS Semarang players
Sportspeople from Papua